Live 2012 may refer to:

Live 2012 (Area album), album by Area
Coldplay Live 2012, a live album by Coldplay
Cranberries Live 2012, a live album by The Cranberries
Thin Lizzy Live 2012, a live album by Thin Lizzy
Apothoesis: Live 2012, a live album by Firewind
Steps Live 2012, a live album by Steps